Johann Karl Balduin von Bruhn (16 March 1803, Herzhorn – 9 August 1877, Altona) was a German journalist and revolutionary.  Because of his philosophical beliefs, Bruhn joined the League of Outlaws and the League of the Just.  When the League of the Just was dissolved into the Communist League, Bruhn became a member of the Communist League.  However, in 1850, Bruhn was expelled from the Communist League.  Later from 1861-1866, Bruhn was the editor of the Lassallean newspaper Nordstern in Hamburg, Germany.

References

1803 births
1877 deaths
German male writers
German revolutionaries
German socialists